The 2020 BinckBank Tour was a road cycling stage race that was originally scheduled to take place between 31 August and 6 September 2020 in Belgium. However, due to the COVID-19 pandemic, the race was postponed by almost a month. It started on 29 September 2020 and ended on 3 October 2020. It was the 16th edition of the BinckBank Tour and was part of the 2020 UCI World Tour.

Teams
Twenty-four teams participated in the 2020 edition. All nineteen UCI WorldTeams were invited automatically and obliged to enter a team into the race. In addition, 5 wildcards were awarded to UCI ProTeams.

UCI WorldTeams

 
 
 
 
 
 
 
 
 
 
 
 
 
 
 
 
 
 
 

UCI ProTeams

Stage characteristics and winners

Stages

Stage 1
29 September 2020 – Blankenberge to Ardooie,

Stage 2
30 September 2020 – Vlissingen to Vlissingen,  (ITT)

Due to a surge in COVID-19 cases in the Netherlands, race organizers were forced to cancel stage 2, which took place entirely within in the Netherlands.

Stage 3
1 October 2020 – Philippine Aalter to Aalter, 

Due to a surge in COVID-19 cases in the Netherlands, race organizers were forced to reroute stage 3, which would have started in Philippine (Netherlands). Stage 3 started and finished in Aalter (Belgium), and riders completed seven laps of the finishing circuit instead of the original three.

Stage 4
2 October 2020 – Riemst to Riemst Sittard-Geleen,  (ITT)

Due to a surge in COVID-19 cases in the Netherlands, race organizers were forced to reroute stage 4, which would have started in Riemst (Belgium) and finished in Sittard-Geleen (Netherlands). Stage 4 became an individual time trial starting and finishing in Riemst.

Stage 5
3 October 2020 – Ottignies-Louvain-la-Neuve to Geraardsbergen,

Classification leadership table

 Due to the cancellation of stage 2, all the jersey wearers after stage 1 retained their jerseys and wore them on stage 3.
 On stage 3, Mads Pedersen, who was second in the points classification, wore the red jersey, because first placed Jasper Philipsen wore the green jersey as the leader of the general classification.
 On stages 4 and 5, Jasper Philipsen, who was second in the points classification, wore the red jersey, because first placed Mads Pedersen wore the green jersey as the leader of the general classification.

Final classification standings

General classification

Points classification

Combativity classification

Teams classification

Notes

References

2020 UCI World Tour
2020 in Belgian sport
2020 in Dutch sport
2020
September 2020 sports events in Belgium
October 2020 sports events in Belgium
Cycling events postponed due to the COVID-19 pandemic